Andrey Downar (born 29 January 1973) is a Belarusian professional football coach nad former player.

Honours
Dinamo-93 Minsk
Belarusian Cup winner: 1994–95

Dinamo Minsk
Belarusian Premier League champion: 1997

External links
 
 
 

1973 births
Living people
Belarusian footballers
Belarus international footballers
FC Dinamo Minsk players
FC Shakhtyor Soligorsk players
FC Dinamo-93 Minsk players
FC Torpedo Minsk players
FC Slavia Mozyr players
FC Minsk players
Association football midfielders
Belarusian football managers
FC Minsk managers